Uragan is the Slavic word for hurricane, and can refer to

BM-27 Uragan, a Russian rocket launcher
Energia-2 or Uragan, a planned Soviet super heavy-lift rocket
GLONASS (satellite), Uragan, the first satellites of the GLONASS constellation
MAZ-7310 Uragan, a Soviet/Russian army vehicle
 M-22 Uragan/Shtil (SA-N-7, Gadfly), a Soviet naval multirole SAM system
 Uragan-class guard ship, Soviet patrol and escort ships
 Uragan-class monitor, Imperial Russian ironclad warships
 Uragan D2, the trade name of a cyanide-based pesticide, formerly Zyklon B
 Uragan-1 (stellarator), Uragan-2, Uragan-2M, Uragan-3, a series of Ukrainian stellarator fusion experiments

See also
 Uragan-1 (disambiguation)